The Handball Tournament at the 2005 Mediterranean Games was held in the Infanta Cristina Sports Hall and Vicar Sports Hall from Saturday 25 June to Saturday 2 July 2005 in Almería, Spain.

Medal summary

Events

Medal table

Men's tournament

Participating teams

Preliminary round

Group A

Group B

Group C

Group D

Final round

Quarter-finals

Semi-finals

Bronze-medal match

Gold-medal match

Final standings

References

External links 
 
 goalzz.com

Sports at the 2005 Mediterranean Games
2005
 
Mediterranean Games
Med
International handball competitions hosted by Spain